The Airtrike 850ti is a German aircraft engine, that was designed and produced by Airtrike of Berlin for use in ultralight aircraft and in particular their Airtrike Eagle 5 design.

The manufacturer entered liquidation on 1 January 2017.

Design and development
The engine is an in-line twin-cylinder four-stroke,  displacement, liquid-cooled, gasoline engine design, with a poly V belt  reduction drive with reduction ratios from 2.0:1 to 4.5:1. It employs dual capacitor discharge ignition and produces  at  6500 rpm, with a compression ratio of 9:1.

Applications
Airtrike Eagle 5

Specifications (850ti)

See also

References

External links

Airtrike aircraft engines
Liquid-cooled aircraft piston engines
2010s aircraft piston engines